Alfredo Benjamin Sabater Caguioa  (born September 30, 1959) is a Filipino lawyer who is an associate justice of the Supreme Court of the Philippines. Prior to his appointment as associate justice, he served as acting secretary of the Department of Justice and chief presidential legal counsel under the presidency of Benigno Aquino III.

Early life and education 
Caguioa was born September 30, 1959. He is a son of Court of Appeals Justice Eduardo P. Caguioa. He finished elementary in Ateneo in 1973 then high school in 1977. He obtained his Economics degree from Ateneo de Manila University in 1981, and obtained a Bachelor of Laws from Ateneo Law School in 1985 where he ranked 5th in his class. On the same year he ranked 15th on the bar exam and was admitted to the Philippine Bar the following year.

Career 
Caguioa joined SyCip Salazar Hernandez and Gatmaitan in 1986 and was a partner there from 1994 until February 2007. Together with five other lawyers from his previous firm, they founded the Caguioa and Gatmaytan and Associates in February 2007. He was a professor at the Ateneo Law School and San Sebastian College College of Law. He became a professor of civil law at the University of Santo Tomas in 2015. Caguioa was cited as a leading Philippine lawyer in dispute resolution by Chambers & Partners in its 2010 and 2011 Asia-Pacific publications.

On January 10, 2013, he was appointed as chief presidential legal counsel of President Benigno Aquino III, his classmate since grade school. He was part of the official delegation of the country to the Permanent Court of Arbitration for the South China Sea arbitration. After the resignation of then Secretary Leila de Lima in October 2015, he was appointed as acting Secretary of the Department of Justice. He was appointed as the 174th Associate Justice of the Supreme Court of the Philippines replacing the retired Associate Justice Martin Villarama Jr.

Awards
In 2016, President Benigno Aquino III awarded Caguioa the rank of Grand Cross or Bayani of the Order of Lakandula for his outstanding service.

References

1959 births
Living people
Associate Justices of the Supreme Court of the Philippines
Ateneo de Manila University alumni
Benigno Aquino III administration cabinet members
Grand Crosses of the Order of Lakandula
Secretaries of Justice of the Philippines